Irina Matrosova (born 5 April 1962) is an Uzbekistani long-distance runner. In 2001, she competed in the women's marathon at the 2001 World Championships in Athletics held in Edmonton, Alberta, Canada. She did not finish her race.

References

External links 
 

Living people
1962 births
Place of birth missing (living people)
Uzbekistani female long-distance runners
Uzbekistani female marathon runners
World Athletics Championships athletes for Uzbekistan
20th-century Uzbekistani women